Sony Pictures Television Inc. (abbreviated as SPT) is an American television production and distribution studio. Based at the Sony Pictures Studios complex in Culver City, it is a division of Sony Entertainment's unit Sony Pictures Entertainment and a subsidiary of the Japanese conglomerate Sony Group Corporation.

History 
SPT's history goes back to 1947, when Pioneer Telefilms was founded by Ralph Cohn, whose father Jack and uncle Harry co-founded Columbia Pictures. Pioneer was bought by Columbia and renamed Screen Gems in November 1948, reincorporated as Columbia Pictures Television on May 6, 1974,
and merged with sister studio TriStar Television (formed in 1986 and relaunched in 1991) to form Columbia TriStar Television on February 21, 1994.

On September 16, 2002, Sony Pictures Entertainment renamed the American studio as Sony Pictures Television and its international division as Sony Pictures Television International (SPTI)).

In summer 2007, SPT introduced The Minisode Network, a digital channel for MySpace airing shows from the 1960s to early 2000s from four to five minutes. In winter 2007, The Minisode Network was also added to a few more sites including AOL TV, YouTube, and its then-sister site Crackle.

In 2008, SPT bought Hilversum, Netherlands-based production company 2waytraffic, international holders of the Who Wants to Be a Millionaire? franchise.

On January 14, 2009, SPT acquired Embassy Row, a television and digital production company by British television producer Michael Davies. Fourteen days later, SPTI acquired a 50% stake in Colombian independent TV production company Teleset.

Three months later on April 1, Sony Pictures consolidated its US and international television divisions under one roof under SPT brand. Sony Pictures Television International now operates in-name-only.

On June 23, 2011, SPT formed Victory Television, a London-based television production company jointly owned by Victoria Ashbourne, SPT's senior vice president of creative development for international production (not to be confused with Jim Victory Television, a defunct syndication company previously owned by MTM Enterprises). On September 25, 2011, Andrea Wong was tapped to head the international television production division of Sony Pictures Television to oversee all international businesses for the studio.

On January 19, 2012, SPT acquired Dolphin Broadcast Services Ltd. and merged it into its existing UK networks business. SPT also took a majority stake in Dolphin's advertising sales business. On March 1, 2012, SPT acquired a majority stake in UK independent production company Silver River Productions. On May 31, SPT launched Sony Movie Channel and AXN in Canada in partnership with Hollywood Suite. Two of Hollywood Suite's networks: Hollywood Festival re-launched as Sony Movie Channel and Hollywood Storm as AXN Movies on September 4, 2012. On August 23, 2012, SPT acquired a majority stake in Left Bank Pictures, a UK production company founded by Andy Harries, Francis Hopkinson, and Marigo Kehoe.

On August 22, 2013, Sony Pictures Television acquired a majority stake in Simon Andrae's new production company Scarlet Media. However, two months later, Andrae dropped his plans for Scarlet and was tapped to become executive vice-president of alternative entertainment for Fox. On December 16, 2013, Tuvalu Media joined forces with financing firm Karmign and acquired SPT's 60% stakes to regain independence. SPT acquired 60% in Tuvalu in 2008.

On June 26, 2014, SPT announced the decision to acquire CSC Media Group including 16 of its cable channels. the deal closed on August 15, 2014. On November 6, 2014, Daisy Goodwin stepped down from Silver River Productions amid Sony's restructuring. The studio had restructured its operations to SPT's streamline operations. She was less active in her production company and had been focusing on her books. On December 1, 2014, SPT acquired Australian drama production company, Playmaker Media.

On July 26, 2014, Liberty Global announced that it had put Film1 up for sale. Liberty Global agreed to sell Film1 to Sony Pictures Television on March 27, 2015. The sale was completed on July 21, 2015.

On May 28, 2015, TriStar Television was re-launched as a boutique production label for Sony Pictures Television. The first new series was Good Girls Revolt and was piloted for Amazon Prime Video.

As of September 2015, it was the world's largest television production and distribution company measured by library and revenue (along with Time Warner's Warner Bros. Television).

On March 1, 2016, Sony announced to shut down Victory Television after Managing Director Victoria Ashbourne announced to step down after five years to pursue other opportunities. SPT retained international distribution rights for all of Victory's productions.
On July 25, 2017, SPE's new chairman and CEO, Tony Vinciquerra tapped Jeff Frost, Chris Parnell, and Jason Clodfelter as co-presidents of SPT. Frost joined SPT in 2008 from ABC Studios, Parnell in 2003 and Clodfelter in 2006.

The same day, Sony Pictures Television Studios was founded, which later began rolling out for current and future SPT titles starting on January 7, 2020.

On July 31, 2017, Sony Pictures Television announced that it would acquire a 95% controlling stake in anime importer Funimation for $143 million pending approval from the U.S. Department of Justice. Sony touted that the deal would allow Funimation to have synergies with its Animax and Kids Station divisions and "direct access to the creative pipeline". The Department of Justice approved the acquisition on August 22, 2017. The deal was closed on October 27, 2017. On September 24, 2019, Sony Pictures Television later announced that it would be consolidating Funimation with Aniplex's Madman Anime Group and Wakanim, under a joint-venture between the two Sony businesses.

On December 10, 2019, Sony Pictures Television announced that it would acquire the British studio Silvergate Media—creators of The Octonauts and the Netflix series Hilda, for US$175 million.

Sony had shifted to content licensing as a focus instead of owning the channels, which were previously high-margin earners. Subsequently, the Southeast Asia channels group were identified as potential for sale. Sony Pictures Television agreed in January 2020 to sell its Southeast Asian and Korean television channels, the AXN network, Animax and Sony One, to KC Global Media, which owned by former SPT executives Andy Kaplan and George Chien. The sale was completed, with the addition of the Gem channel, in May 2020.

On May 14, 2021, SPT sold its UK television channels (including some assets of CSC Media Group) to Narrative Capital.

On October 1, 2021, SPT sold its Central and Eastern Europe television channels and two OTT services to Antenna Group.

On December 1, 2021, SPT bought a majority stake in the Welsh production company, Bad Wolf.

In October 2022, Banijay completed its purchase of Sony Pictures Television Germany, which was renamed Noisy Pictures.

Sony Pictures Television networks 
These are the channels owned and operated and jointly operated by Sony Pictures Television. For channels owned under CSC Media Group, see CSC Media Group.
 Sony Channel
 Game Show Network: Launched on December 1, 1994.
 Culver Max Entertainment: Launched as Set India Private Limited on September 30, 1995.
 AXN: Launched on June 22, 1997
 Animax: Launched on May 20, 1998
 Sony Movies: Launched on October 1, 2010. Also operates in the United Kingdom (formerly Movies4Men 2) and Ireland.
 GetTV: A digital multicast network to air classic films and series by Sony Pictures, Universal Studios, MGM, and CBS Media Ventures that was scheduled to launch in Fall 2013. It was later launched on February 3, 2014.
 Sony Cine: A US/Spanish language network launched in August 2012.

Past names 
 Pioneer Telefilms (1947–1948)
 Screen Gems (1948–1974)
 Columbia Pictures Television (1974–2001)
 TriStar Television (1986–1988, 1991–1999)
 Columbia TriStar Television (1994–2002)

See also 
 List of Sony Pictures Television programs

References

External links 

 Active official website: https://www.sonypictures.com/tv

 

American brands
 
2002 establishments in California
American companies established in 2002
Mass media companies established in 2002
Cable network groups in the United States
Television broadcasting companies of the United States
Television production companies of the United States
Television syndication distributors
Entertainment companies based in California
Companies based in Culver City, California
Sony Pictures Entertainment
Sony subsidiaries